Grass River Provincial Park is a 2,279 km2 provincial park in Northwestern Manitoba, Canada. Designated in 1963, the park is approximately 75 km north of The Pas and is centered on the Grass River. The southern part of the park includes portions of the dolomitic Manitoba Lowlands portion of the Interior Plains, while the northern portion includes part of the granitic Canadian Shield.  The entire park shows evidence of glaciation. The park is considered to be a Class III protected area under the IUCN protected area management categories.

During the 20th century a number of mines operated in the park, the last of which closed in 1993.

See also
List of protected areas of Manitoba

References

External links
Grass River Provincial Park
iNaturalist.ca: Grass River Provincial Park

Provincial parks of Manitoba
Parks in Northern Manitoba
Protected areas established in 1963
1963 establishments in Manitoba
Protected areas of Manitoba